In City Dreams is guitarist and songwriter Robin Trower's fifth solo studio album, released in 1977. James Dewar passed the bass playing duties over to Rustee Allen and concentrated on vocals. It was certified gold by the RIAA on 18 November 1977.

Track listing
All tracks composed by Robin Trower and James Dewar; except where indicated.

Side one
"Somebody Calling" – 4:56
"Sweet Wine of Love" – 2:57
"Bluebird" – 5:32
"Falling Star" - 2:45
"Farther On Up the Road" (Don Robey, Joe Veasey) – 2:33

Side two
"Smile" – 4:45
"Little Girl"– 4:51
"Love's Gonna Bring You Round" – 4:36
"In City Dreams" – 5:14

Personnel 
 James Dewar – vocals
 Robin Trower – guitar
 Rustee Allen – bass
 Bill Lordan – drums

Charts

References

External links 
 Robin Trower - In City Dreams (1977) album releases & credits at Discogs
 Robin Trower - In City Dreams (1977) album to be listened on Spotify
 Robin Trower - In City Dreams (1977) album to be listened on YouTube

1977 albums
Robin Trower albums
Chrysalis Records albums